Brennecke is a German surname. Notable people with the surname include:

Günther Brennecke (born 1927), German field hockey player
Horst Brennecke (born 1939), German field hockey player
Joachim Brennecke (1919–2011), German actor
Kurt Brennecke (1891–1982), German Wehrmacht general
Wilhelm Brennecke (1918–1998), German Luftwaffe pilot

German-language surnames